The Spektr-UV, also known as World Space Observatory-Ultraviolet (WSO-UV), is a proposed ultraviolet space telescope intended for work in the 115 nm to 315 nm wavelength range. The launch had initially been planned for 2007, but has since been continually delayed; as of February 2023, the launch is planned for the end of 2028 atop an Angara A5M rocket from Vostochny Cosmodrome.

Overview 
The main instrument of the observatory is a 1.7-metre Ritchey–Chrétien telescope. The telescope will be equipped with the following instruments:

WSO-UV Spectrographs Unit (WUVS) (Russia/Japan) 
The WUVS spectrographs assembly consists of four channels:

 Vacuum Ultraviolet Echelle Spectrograph, VUVES (Russia): The FUV high-resolution spectrograph (VUVES) provides echelle spectroscopy capabilities with high resolution (R ~ 50 000) in the 115–176 nm range.
 Ultraviolet Echelle Spectrograph, UVES (Russia): The NUV high-resolution spectrograph (UVES) provides echelle spectroscopy capabilities with R ~ 50 000 in the 174–310 nm range.
 Long-Slit Spectrograph, LSS (Russia): The Long-Slit Spectrograph (LSS) provides low resolution (R ~ 1000), long slit spectroscopy in the 115–305 nm range. The spatial resolution is better than 0.5 arcsec(0.1 arcsec as the best value).
 UV Spectrograph for observation of Earth-like Exoplanets, UVSPEX (Japan)

WSO-UV Field Camera Unit (FCU) (Russia/Spain) 
The FCU has two channels, each fed by an independent pick off mirror:

 Field Camera Unit FUV channel (FCU/FUV) (Russia/Spain): The far UV (FUV) channel has capabilities for high resolution imaging through the MCP detector, scale 0,047 arcsec/pixel in 115–190 nm range.
 Field Camera Unit UVO channel (FCU/UVO) (Russia): The UV-optical (UVO) channel is designed for wide field imaging through the CCD detector, scale 0,146 arcsec/pixel in 185–810 nm range.

Proposed and former instruments 
 Stellar Coronograph for Exoplanet Direct Imaging, SCEDI (NAOJ, Rikkyo University, Japan).
 HIRDES (High-Resolution Double Echelle Spectrograph): R~55000 spectroscopy of point sources in the 102–320 nm range (Germany). Germany exited the Spektr-UV programme due to financial problems, so Russia replaced HIRDES with WUVES.
 ISSIS (Imaging and Slitless Spectroscopy Instrument for Surveys) was being developed to carry out UV and optical diffraction limited imaging of astronomical objects. The ISSIS would have incorporated three channels: High Sensitivity Far-UV Channel: 120–200 nm; Channel for Surveys (FUV): 120–600 nm, optimized for 120–270 nm; Channel for Surveys (UVO): 120–600 nm, optimized for 270–600 nm (Spain). Due to financial problems, Spain canceled ISSIS, and limited participation in Spektr-UV program to ground segment and supply of detectors for FCU. Russia replaced ISSIS with FCU.

History 

In October 2012, tests of antennas for the space telescope were completed.

In July 2019, INASAN selected the first seven experiments to be performed by the observatory.

Participating nations 
Spektr-UV is an international project led by Russia (Roscosmos).
At present the international cooperation includes three basic participants: Russia (will provide the telescope, spacecraft, launch facilities, ground segment); Spain (FCU detectors, ground segment); Japan (UVSPEX).

See also
 List of proposed space observatories

References

External links
 WSO-UV web-site

2028 in spaceflight
Ultraviolet telescopes
2020s in Russia
Satellites of Russia
Roscosmos
Space telescopes
Proposed spacecraft